Slovakia competed at the 2018 Winter Olympics in Pyeongchang, South Korea, from 9 to 25 February 2018, with 56 competitors in 7 sports. Biathlete Anastasiya Kuzmina was the country's sole medalist, taking one gold and two silver medals, earning Slovakia 17th place in the overall medal table.

Medalists

Competitors
The following is the list of number of competitors participating at the Games per sport/discipline.

Alpine skiing

Men

Women

Mixed

Biathlon 

Based on their Nations Cup rankings in the 2016–17 Biathlon World Cup, Slovakia has qualified a team of 5 men and 5 women.

Men

Women

Mixed

Cross-country skiing

Slovakia has qualified 3 men and 2 women.

Distance

Sprint

Qualification legend: Q – Qualify on position in heat; q – Qualify on time in round

Figure skating 

Slovakia qualified one female figure skater, based on its placement at the 2017 World Figure Skating Championships in Helsinki, Finland.  They additionally qualified one entry in ice dance through the 2017 CS Nebelhorn Trophy.

Ice hockey 

Summary

Men's tournament

Slovakia men's national ice hockey team qualified by finishing as one of the top eight teams in the 2015 IIHF World Ranking.

Team roster
Men's team event – 1 team of 25 players

Preliminary round

Qualification playoff

Luge 

Based on the results from the World Cups during the 2017–18 Luge World Cup season, Slovakia qualified 4 sleds.

Mixed team relay

Snowboarding 

Freestyle

Qualification Legend: QF – Qualify directly to final; QS – Qualify to semifinal

References

Nations at the 2018 Winter Olympics
2018
Winter Olympics